Josemaría Escrivá de Balaguer y Albás (9 January 1902 – 26 June 1975) was a Spanish Roman Catholic priest. He founded Opus Dei, an organization of laypeople and priests dedicated to the teaching that everyone is called to holiness by God and to discover sanctity in their ordinary lives. He was canonized in 2002 by Pope John Paul II, who declared Josemaría should be "counted among the great witnesses of Christianity."

Escrivá gained a doctorate in civil law at the Complutense University of Madrid and a doctorate in theology at the Lateran University in Rome. His principal work was the initiation, government and expansion of Opus Dei. Escrivá's best-known publication is The Way, which has been translated into 43 languages and has sold several million copies.

Escrivá and Opus Dei have been accused of secrecy, elitism, cult-like practices, and involvement with right-wing causes, such as the rule of Francisco Franco in Spain (1939–1975). After his death, his canonization attracted considerable attention and controversy among some Catholics and the worldwide press. Several journalists who have investigated the history of Opus Dei, among them Vatican analyst John L. Allen Jr., have argued that many of these accusations are unproven or have grown from allegations by enemies of Escrivá and his organization. Cardinal Albino Luciani (later Pope John Paul I), John Paul II, Benedict XVI, Pope Francis, Óscar Romero, and many other Catholic leaders have endorsed Escrivá's teaching concerning the universal call to holiness, the role of the laity, and the sanctifying effect of ordinary work. According to Allen, among Catholics, Escrivá is "reviled by some and venerated by millions more".

Biography

Early life

José María Mariano Escriva y Albás was born to José Escriva y Corzán and his wife, María de los Dolores Albás y Blanc on 9 January 1902, in the small town of Barbastro, in Huesca, Spain, the second of six children and the first of two sons. José Escrivá was a merchant and a partner in a textile company that eventually went bankrupt, forcing the family to relocate in 1915 to the city of Logroño, in the northern province of La Rioja, where he worked as a clerk in a clothing store. Young Josemaría first felt that "he had been chosen for something", it is reported, when he saw footprints left in the snow by a monk walking barefoot.

With his father's blessing, Escrivá prepared to become a priest of the Catholic Church.  He studied first in Logroño and then in Zaragoza, where he was ordained as deacon on Saturday, 20 December 1924. He was ordained a priest, also in Zaragoza, on Saturday, 28 March 1925. After a brief appointment to a rural parish in Perdiguera, he went to Madrid, the Spanish capital, in 1927 to study law at the Central University. In Madrid, Escrivá was employed as a private tutor and as a chaplain to the Foundation of Santa Isabel, which comprised the royal Convent of Santa Isabel and a school managed by the Little Sisters of the Assumption.

Mission as the founder of Opus Dei
A prayerful retreat helped him to discern more definitely what he considered to be God's will for him, and, on 2 October 1928, he "saw" Opus Dei, a way by which Catholics might learn to sanctify themselves by their secular work. He founded it in 1928, and Pius XII gave it final approval in 1950. According to the decree of the Congregation for the Causes of Saints, which contains a condensed biography of Escrivá, "[t]o this mission he gave himself totally. From the beginning his was a very wide-ranging apostolate in social environments of all kinds. He worked especially among the poor and the sick languishing in the slums and hospitals of Madrid."

During the Spanish Civil War, Escrivá fled from Madrid, which was controlled by the anti-clerical Republicans, via Andorra and France, to the city of Burgos, which was the headquarters of General Francisco Franco's Nationalist forces. After the war ended in 1939 with Franco's victory, Escrivá was able to resume his studies in Madrid and complete a doctorate in law, for which he submitted a thesis on the historical jurisdiction of the Abbess of Santa María la Real de Las Huelgas.

The Priestly Society of the Holy Cross, affiliated with Opus Dei, was founded on Sunday, 14 February 1943.  Escrivá relocated to Rome in 1946. The decree declaring Escrivá "Venerable" states that "in 1947 and on Monday, 16 June 1950, he obtained approval of Opus Dei as an institution of pontifical right. With tireless charity and operative hope he guided the development of Opus Dei throughout the world, activating a vast mobilization of lay people ... He gave life to numerous initiatives in the work of evangelization and human welfare; he fostered vocations to the priesthood and the religious life everywhere... Above all, he devoted himself tirelessly to the task of forming the members of Opus Dei."

Later years

According to some accounts, at the age of two he suffered from a disease (perhaps epilepsy) so severe that the doctors expected him to die soon, but his mother had taken him to Torreciudad, where the Aragonese locals venerated a statue of the Virgin Mary (as "Our Lady of the Angels"), thought to date from the 11th century. Escrivá recovered and, as the director of Opus Dei during the 1960s and 1970s, promoted and oversaw the design and construction of a major shrine at Torreciudad. The new shrine was inaugurated on 7 July 1975, soon after Escrivá's death, and to this day remains the spiritual center of Opus Dei, as well as an important destination for pilgrimage. By the time of Escrivá's death in 1975, the members of Opus Dei numbered some 60,000 in 80 countries. As an adult, Escrivá suffered from type 1 diabetes and, according to some sources, also epilepsy.

In 1950, Escrivá was appointed an Honorary Domestic Prelate by Pope Pius XII, which allowed him to use the title of Monsignor. In 1955, he received a doctorate of theology from the Pontifical Lateran University in Rome. He was a consultor to two Vatican congregations (the Congregation for Seminaries and Universities and the Pontifical Commission for the Authentic Interpretation of the Code of Canon Law) and an honorary member of the Pontifical Academy of Theology. The Second Vatican Council (1962–65) confirmed the importance of the universal call to holiness, the role of the laity, and the Mass as the basis of Christian life.

In 1948 Escrivá founded the Collegium Romanum Sanctae Crucis (Roman College of the Holy Cross), Opus Dei's educational center for men, in Rome. In 1953 he founded the Collegium Romanum Sanctae Mariae (Roman College of Saint Mary) to serve the women's section (these institutions are now joined into the Pontifical University of the Holy Cross.) Escrivá also established the University of Navarre, in Pamplona, and the University of Piura (in Peru), as secular institutions affiliated with Opus Dei. Escrivá died of cardiac arrest on 26 June 1975, aged 73.

Three years after Escrivá died, the then Cardinal Albino Luciani (later Pope John Paul I) celebrated the originality of his contribution to Christian spirituality.

Personality and attitudes

Attitudes in general
One of the persons who knew Escrivá best was the Bishop of Madrid, where Opus Dei was initiated, Bishop Leopoldo Eijo y Garay, for Escrivá would visit and report to him quite frequently and the two established a very strong friendship. In a 1943 report to Rome, the bishop stated: "The distinctive notes of his character are his energy and his capacity for organization and government; with an ability to pass unnoticed. He has shown himself most obedient to the Church hierarchy -- one very special hallmark of his priestly work is the way he fosters, in speech and in writing, in public and in private, love for Holy Mother Church and for the Roman Pontiff." Bishop Eijo y Garay wrote to the Jesuit Provincial of Toledo, Carlos Gomez Martinho, S.J. in 1941: "Fr. Escrivá is an exemplary priest, chosen by God for apostolic enterprises; humble, prudent, self-sacrificing in work, docile to his bishop, of outstanding intelligence and with a very solid spiritual and doctrinal formation." Eijo y Garay told an officer of the Falange that "[T]o think that Fr. Josemaría Escrivá is capable of creating anything secret is absurd. He is as frank and open as a child!" 

Viktor Frankl, an Austrian psychiatrist and neurologist, founder of "logotherapy", and a Nazi concentration camp survivor, met Escrivá in Rome in 1970 and later wrote of "the refreshing serenity which emanated from him and warmed the whole conversation", and "the unbelievable rhythm" with which his thought flowed, and finally "his amazing capacity" for getting into "immediate contact" with those with whom he was speaking. Frankl went on: "Escrivá evidently lived totally in the present moment, he opened out to it completely, and gave himself entirely to it."

According to Álvaro del Portillo, who was Escrivá's closest collaborator for many years, there was one basic quality of Escrivá "that pervaded everything else: his dedication to God, and to all souls for God's sake; his constant readiness to correspond generously to the will of God." Pope Paul VI summarized his opinion of what he termed the "extraordinariness" of Escrivá's sanctity in this way: "He is one of those men who has received the most charisms (supernatural gifts) and have corresponded most generously to them."

"The first impression one gets from watching Escrivá 'live'", John L. Allen Jr. writes after watching some movies on the founder of Opus Dei in 2005, "is his effervescence, his keen sense of humor. He cracks jokes, makes faces, roams the stage, and generally leaves his audience in stitches in off-the-cuff responses to questions from people in the crowd."

Critics, such as Spanish architect Miguel Fisac, who was one of the earliest members of Opus Dei and who associated with Escrivá for nearly twenty years before ending his relation with Escrivá and Opus Dei, have given a very different description of Escrivá as a pious but vain, secretive, and ambitious man, given to private displays of violent temper, and who demonstrated little charity towards others or genuine concern for the poor. According to British journalist Giles Tremlett, "biographies of Escrivá have produced conflicting visions of the saint as either a loving, caring charismatic person or a mean-spirited, manipulative egoist". French historian Édouard de Blaye has referred to Escrivá as a "mixture of mysticism and ambition".

Towards God

Prayer
On the centennial of Escrivá's birthday, Cardinal Ratzinger (who became Pope Benedict XVI) commented: "I have always been impressed by Josemaría Escrivá's explanation of the name 'Opus Dei': an explanation ... gives us an idea of the founder's spiritual profile. Escrivá knew he had to found something, but he was also conscious that what he was founding was not his own work, that he himself did not invent anything and that the Lord was merely making use of him. So it was not his work, but Opus Dei (God's Work). [This] gives us to understand that he was in a permanent dialogue, a real contact with the One who created us and works for us and with us... If therefore St Josemaría speaks of the common vocation to holiness, it seems to me that he is basically drawing on his own personal experience, not of having done incredible things himself, but of having let God work. Therefore a renewal, a force for good was born in the world even if human weaknesses will always remain."

In his canonization homily, Pope John Paul II described Escrivá as "a master in the practice of prayer, which he considered to be an extraordinary 'weapon' to redeem the world...It is not a paradox but a perennial truth; the fruitfulness of the apostolate lies above all in prayer and in intense and constant sacramental life." In John Paul II's Decree of Canonization, he refers to the five brief prayers or aspirations of Escrivá through which "one can trace the entire life story of Blessed Josemaría Escrivá. He was barely sixteen when he began to recite the first two aspirations [Domine, ut videam!, Lord, that I might see! and Domina, ut sit!, Lady, that it might be!], as soon as he had the first inklings of God's call. They expressed the burning desire of his heart: to see what God was asking of him, so that he might do it without delay, lovingly fulfilling the Lord's will. The third aspiration [Omnes cum Petro ad Iesum per Mariam!, All together with Peter to Jesus through Mary!] appears frequently in his writings as a young priest and shows how his zeal to win souls for God went hand in hand with both a firm determination to be faithful to the Church and an ardent devotion to Mary, the Virgin Mother of God. Regnare Christum volumus! We want Christ to reign!: these words aptly express his constant pastoral concern to spread among all men and women the call to share, through Christ, in the dignity of God's children. God's sons and daughters should live for the purpose, to serve Him alone: Deo omnis gloria! All the glory to God!"

During the thanksgiving Mass for the canonization of St. Josemaría, John Paul II, said: "In the Founder of Opus Dei, there is an extraordinary love for the will of God. There exists a sure criterion of holiness: fidelity in accomplishing the divine will down to the last consequences. For each one of us the Lord has a plan, to each he entrusts a mission on earth. The saint could not even conceive of himself outside of God's plan. He lived only to achieve it. St Josemaría was chosen by the Lord to announce the universal call to holiness and to point out that daily life and ordinary activities are a path to holiness. One could say that he was the saint of ordinary life."

Not all Catholic commentators, however, were impressed equally by Escrivá's spirituality.  For instance, the Swiss theologian Hans Urs von Balthasar wrote in an article of 1963 that Escrivá's The Way provided an "insufficient spirituality" to sustain a religious organization and that the book was hardly more than "a little Spanish manual for advanced Boy Scouts". Von Balthasar also questioned the attitudes towards prayer described by The Way, declaring that Escrivá's use of prayer 
Von Balthasar repeated his negative evaluation of The Way in a television interview from 1984.

Similar criticism of Escrivá's spirituality has been stated by other commentators: for instance, according to Kenneth L. Woodward, a journalist who specializes in articles about the Catholic Church, "to judge by his writings alone, Escrivá's was an unexceptional spirit, derivative and often banal in his thoughts, personally inspiring, perhaps, but devoid of original insights", whose book The Way reveals "a remarkable narrowness of mind, weariness of human sexuality, and artlessness of expression."

Towards the liturgy
Escrivá conceived the Mass as the "Source and summit of the Christian's interior life," a terminology which was later used by the Second Vatican Council. Escrivá strove to obey whatever was indicated by the competent authority regarding the celebration of Mass and "[h]e took all necessary steps to ensure that the prescriptions of Vatican II, notably in the area of the liturgy, were applied within Opus Dei." As his prayer was much integrated with traditional liturgy, Escrivá found the transition difficult and asked Echevarría to help him with respect to the new rites. Although he missed the practices of the old rites, especially some gestures such as the kissing of the paten (a small plate, usually made of silver or gold, used to hold Eucharistic bread), he prohibited his devotees to ask for any dispensation for him "out of a spirit of obedience to ecclesiastical norms... He has decided to show his love for the liturgy through the new rite", commented Echevarría. However, when Annibale Bugnini, Secretary of the Consilium for the Implementation of the Constitution on the Liturgy, learned of Escrivá's difficulties, he granted Escrivá the possibility of celebrating the Mass using the old rite. Whenever Escrivá celebrated this rite, he did so only in the presence of one Mass server.

Vladimir Felzmann, a priest who worked as Escrivá's personal assistant before quitting Opus Dei in 1981, claimed in an interview for Newsweek that Escrivá was so distraught by the reforms introduced by the Second Vatican Council that he and his deputy, Álvaro del Portillo, "went to Greece in 1967 to see if [they] could bring Opus Dei into the Greek Orthodox Church. Escrivá thought the [Catholic] church was a shambles and that the Orthodox might be the salvation of himself and of Opus Dei as the faithful remnant."  Felzmann claims that Escrivá soon abandoned those plans as impracticable. Flavio Capucci, a member of Opus Dei and the postulator of the cause for Escrivá's canonization, denies that Escrivá ever contemplated quitting the Catholic Church.  This was also denied by the information office of Opus Dei, which stated that Escrivá's visit to Greece in 1966 was done in order to analyze the convenience of organizing Opus Dei in that country, and that Escrivá even brought back icons as presents for Pope Paul VI and Angelo Dell'Acqua (then the substitute to the Vatican Secretary of State), whom he had informed of the visit beforehand.

Mortification
Escrivá taught that "joy has its roots in the form of a cross", and that "suffering is the touchstone of love", convictions which were represented in his own life. He practiced corporal mortification personally and recommended it to others in Opus Dei. In particular, his enthusiasm for the practice of self-flagellation has attracted controversy, with critics quoting testimonies about Escrivá whipping himself furiously until the walls of his cubicle were speckled with blood. Both the practice of self-mortification as a form of penance, and the conviction that suffering can help a person to acquire sanctity, have ample precedent in Catholic teaching and practice. Referring to Escrivá, John Paul II stated in Christifideles omnes:

Towards the Virgin Mary

Pope John Paul II stated on Sunday, 6 October 2002, after the Angelus greetings: "Love for our Lady is a constant characteristic of the life of Josemaría Escrivá and is an eminent part of the legacy that he left to his spiritual sons and daughters." The Pope also said that "St. Josemaría wrote a beautiful small book called The Holy Rosary which presents spiritual childhood, a real disposition of spirit of those who wish to attain total abandonment to the divine will".

When Escrivá was 10 or 11 years old, he already had the habit of carrying the rosary in his pocket. As a priest, he would ordinarily end his homilies and his personal prayer with a conversation with the Blessed Virgin. He instructed that all rooms in the offices of Opus Dei should have an image of the Virgin. He encouraged his spiritual children to greet these images when they entered a room. He encouraged a Marian apostolate, preaching that "To Jesus we go and to Him we return through Mary". While looking at a picture of the Virgin of Guadalupe giving a rose to San Juan Diego, he commented: "I would like to die that way." On 26 June 1975, after entering his work room, which had a painting of the Virgin of Guadalupe, he slumped on the floor and died.

Towards people
"Escrivá de Balaguer was a very human saint", preached John Paul II. "All those who met him, whatever their culture or social status, felt he was a father, totally devoted to serving others, for he was convinced that every soul is a marvellous treasure; indeed, every person is worth all of Christ's Blood. This attitude of service is obvious in his dedication to his priestly ministry and in the magnanimity with which he started so many works of evangelization and human advancement for the poorest persons."

Former numerary María del Carmen Tapia (born 1925), who worked with Escrivá for 18 years inside the organization, seven as his secretary, wrote in her book, Beyond the Threshold: A Life in Opus Dei, that Escrivá often became angry, and that as secretary in charge of recording his words and actions, she was not allowed to record anything negative that she witnessed. She claims she was subjected to abusive words from Escrivá, who called her filthy names, and then screamed during this meeting with both men and women present, upbraiding a member who helped Tapia send letters. She was kept prisoner in the headquarters of Opus Dei in Rome from November 1965 until March 1966. "I was held completely deprived of any outside contact with the absolute prohibition to go out for any reason or receive or make telephone calls or to write or receive letters. Nor could I go out for the so-called weekly walk or the monthly excursion. I was a prisoner."

However, some of his devotees claim that, through him, Opus Dei has been able to better the quality of life of many women, and refer to his respect for women and his interest in improving their lives. Historian Elizabeth Fox-Genovese, a Catholic convert, asserted that "Opus Dei has an enviable record of educating the poor and supporting women, whether single or married, in any occupation they choose."

Towards his family
Opus Dei's founder modified his name in several ways over the course of his life. In the church records of the cathedral at Barbastro, he appears as having been baptized four days after birth with the name José María Julián Mariano, and his surname was spelled Escriba.  As early as his school days, José Escrivá had "adopted the rather more distinguished version spelled with a "v" rather than a "b." His name is spelled Escrivá in the memento of his first Mass. According to critics like Luis Carandell and Michael Walsh a former Jesuit priest, he also adopted the use of the conjunction y ("and") joining his father's and mother's surnames ("Escrivá y Albás"), a usage which he claims is associated with aristocratic families, even though that has been the legal naming format in Spain since 1870.

On 16 June 1940, the Spanish Boletín Oficial del Estado ("Official State Bulletin") records that Escrivá requested of the government that he be permitted to change his "first surname so that it will be written Escrivá de Balaguer". He justified the petition on the grounds that "the name Escrivá is common in the east coast and in Catalonia, leading to harmful and annoying confusion".  On 20 June 1943, when he was 41 years old, the registry book of the Barbastro cathedral and the baptismal certificate of José María were annotated to represent "that the surname Escriba was changed to Escrivá de Balaguer".  Balaguer is the name of the town in Catalonia from which Escrivá's paternal family derived.

One of the earliest members of Opus Dei, and a friend for many years, the architect Miguel Fisac, who later quit Opus Dei, said that Escrivá found it embarrassing to have his father's family name since his father's company became bankrupt, that he had a "great affection for the aristocracy", and that, when Escrivá was a chaplain at the Foundation of Santa Isabel in Madrid, he would often meet aristocratic visitors who would ask, upon learning that his name was Escrivá, whether he belonged to the noble Escrivá de Romaní family, only to ignore him when they learned that he did not. According to Vásquez de Prada, a writer, Opus Dei member, and official biographer who produced a three-volume biography of Escrivá, the act had nothing to do with ambition but was motivated rather by fairness and loyalty to his family. The main problem is that in Spanish the letters b and v are pronounced in the same way and therefore bureaucrats and clerics had made mistakes in transcribing the Escrivá family name in some official documents throughout the generations. Defenders of Escrivá have also argued that the addition of "de Balaguer" corresponded to a practice adopted by many Spanish families that felt a need to distinguish themselves from others with the same surname but proceeding from different regions and consequently having different histories.

Escrivá's younger brother Santiago stated that his brother "loved the members of his family" and took good care of them. When their father died, he says, Escrivá told their mother that "she should stay calm, because he will always take care of us. And he fulfilled this promise." Escrivá would find time in his busy schedule to chat and take a walk with his younger brother, acting like a father towards him. When the family transferred to Madrid, he obeyed the instructions of their father that he obtain a doctorate in Law. "Thanks to his docility to this advice", says Santiago, "he was able to support the family by giving classes in Law, and with this he acquired a juridical mentality ... which would later be so necessary to do Opus Dei." Escrivá also modified his first name. From José María, he changed it to the original Josemaría. Biographers state, that around 1935 [age 33], "he joined his first two names because his single love for the Virgin Mary and Saint Joseph were equally inseparable".

Towards his country
Many of his contemporaries recount the tendency of Escrivá to preach about patriotism as opposed to nationalism.

Critics have alleged that Escrivá personally, as well as the organization of Opus Dei, were associated originally with the ideology of "National Catholicism", particularly during the Spanish Civil War and the years immediately after it, and that they were therefore also closely associated with the authoritarian regime of General Franco. According to Catalan sociologist Joan Estruch:

Estruch cites, for instance, the fact that the first edition of Escrivá's The Way, finished in Burgos and published in Valencia in 1939, had the dateline Año de la Victoria ("Year of the Victory"), referring to Franco's military triumph over the Republican forces in the civil war, as well as a prologue by a pro-Franco bishop, Xavier Lauzurica, which ended with the admonition to the reader to "always stay vigilant and alert, because the enemy does not sleep. If you make these maxims your life, you will be a perfect imitator of Jesus Christ and a gentleman without blemish. And with Christs like you Spain will return to the old grandeur of its saints, wise men, and heroes." Escrivá preached personally to General Franco and his family during a week-long spiritual retreat at the Pardo Palace (Franco's official residence) in April 1946.

Vittorio Messori claims that the ties between Escrivá and Francoism are part of a black legend propagated against Escrivá and Opus Dei. Allen states that based on his research Escrivá could not be said to be pro-Franco (for which he was criticized for not joining other Catholics in openly praising Franco) nor anti-Franco (for which he was criticized for not being "pro-democracy"). According to Allen, there is no statement from Escrivá for or against Franco. Escrivá's devotees and some historians have emphasized his personal effort to avoid partiality in politics. Professor Peter Berglar, a German historian, asserts that Franco's falangists suspected Escrivá of "internationalism, anti-Spainism and Freemasonry" and that during "the first decade of Franco's regime, Opus Dei and Escrivá were attacked with perseverance bordering on fanaticism, not by enemies, but by supporters of the new Spanish State. Escrivá was even reported to the Tribunal for the Fight against Freemasonry".

Awards and honors
Escrivá received several awards:
The Grand Cross of Alfonso X the Wise (1951)
The Gold Cross of St. Raymond of Penyafort (1954)
The Grand Cross of Isabella the Catholic (1956)
The Grand Cross of Charles III (1960)
Doctor Honoris Causa by the University of Zaragoza (Spain, 1960)
The Gold Medal by the City council of Barbastro (1975).

Some biographers have said that Escrivá did not seek these awards, that they were nevertheless granted to him, that he accepted them due to charity to those who were granting these, and that he did not give the slightest importance to these awards.  Journalist Luis Carandell, however, recounts testimonies about how members of Opus Dei paid for the insignia of the Grand Cross of Charles III to be made from gold, only to have Escrivá angrily reject it and demand instead one encrusted with diamonds. Carandell holds that this episode was part of a larger pattern in Escrivá's life of ambition for social prestige and the trappings of wealth. Sympathetic biographers, however, insist that Escrivá taught that material things are good, but that people should not get attached to them and should serve only God.  It is reported that he declared that "he has most who needs least" and that it took only 10 minutes to gather his possessions after his death.

Controversies
In addition to the questions raised about the depth of Escrivá's spirituality and theological thinking, his purported habits of secretiveness and elitism (although for the most part, Opus Dei faithful belong to the middle-to-low levels of society, in terms of education, income and social status), his alleged bad temper and ambition for social status and worldly luxuries, several other specific aspects of Escrivá's life and work have generated some criticism, particularly regarding his canonization by the Catholic Church. The sources of criticism include his alleged private statements in defence of Adolf Hitler, collaboration by members of Opus Dei with right-wing political causes (especially during General Francisco Franco's dictatorship in Spain), Escrivá's request for the rehabilitation in his favour of an aristocratic title and allegations that he maintained bad relations with other Catholic officials, of whom he could be very critical in private.

Alleged defence of Hitler
During Escrivá's beatification process, Vladimir Felzmann, who had been Escrivá's personal assistant before Felzmann quit Opus Dei and became a priest of the Roman Catholic Archdiocese of Westminster and an aide to Cardinal Basil Hume, sent several letters to Flavio Capucci, the postulator (i.e., chief promoter) of Escrivá's cause. In his letters, Felzmann claimed that in 1967 or 1968, during the intermission to a World War II movie, Escrivá had said to him, "Vlad, Hitler couldn't have been such a bad person. He couldn't have killed six million. It couldn't have been more than four million". Felzmann later explained that those remarks should be regarded in the context of Catholic anticommunism in Spain, emphasizing that in 1941 all of the male members of Opus Dei, who then numbered about fifty, offered to join the "Blue Division", a group of Spaniard volunteers who joined the German forces in their fight against the Soviet Army, along the Eastern Front. Another phrase that has been attributed to Escrivá by some of his critics is "Hitler against the Jews, Hitler against the Slavs, means Hitler against Communism".

Álvaro del Portillo, who succeeded Escrivá as the director of Opus Dei, declared that any claims that Escrivá endorsed Hitler were "a patent falsehood" and part of "a slanderous campaign". He and others have stated that Escrivá regarded Hitler as a "pagan", a "racist" and a "tyrant" (see Opus Dei and politics).

Alleged support for right-wing leaders
One of the most controversial accusations against Escrivá is that he and Opus Dei were active in bolstering far-right regimes, especially the dictatorship of General Francisco Franco in Spain.  After 1957, several members of Opus Dei served as ministers in Franco's government. In particular, the "technocrats" most associated with the "Spanish miracle" of the 1960s were members of Opus Dei: Alberto Ullastres, Mariano Navarro Rubio, Gregorio López-Bravo, Laureano López Rodó, Juan José Espinosa, and Faustino García-Moncó.  Most of these "technocrats" entered the government under the patronage of Admiral Luis Carrero Blanco who, though not a member of Opus Dei himself, was reportedly sympathetic to the organization and its values and who, as Franco grew older and more frail, increasingly came to exercise the day-to-day control of the Spanish government.

According to journalist Luis Carandell, when Ullastres and Navarro Rubio were first appointed to the government in 1957, Escrivá gleefully exclaimed "They have made us ministers!" something which Opus Dei has officially denied.  On 23 May 1958, Escrivá sent a letter to Franco, which said, in part:

In 1963, Swiss Catholic theologian Hans Urs von Balthasar wrote a scathing critique of Escrivá's spirituality, characterizing Escrivá's approach religion as a form of "integrism", stating "despite the affirmations of the members of Opus Dei that they are free in their political options, it is undeniable that its foundation is marked by Francoism, that that is the 'law within which it has been formed'". In another essay, published the following year, von Balthasar characterized Opus Dei as "an integrist concentration of power within the Church", explaining that the main objective of integrism is "imposing the spiritual with worldly means".

In 1979, von Balthasar distanced himself from a newspaper attack on Opus Dei which had cited his earlier accusations of integrism.  He wrote in a personal letter to the Prelature, sent also to the Neue Zürcher Zeitung, that "because of my lack of concrete information, I am not able to give an informed opinion about Opus Dei today. On the other hand, one thing strikes me as obvious: many of the criticisms levelled against the movement, including those of your own journal concerning the religious instruction given by Opus Dei members, seem to me to be false and anti-clerical."  Von Balthasar maintained his unfavourable judgment of Escrivá's spirituality and repeated it in a television interview in 1984, but he did not renew his criticism of Opus Dei as an organization.  In 1988, von Balthasar was named as a cardinal by Pope John Paul II, but he died before he could be elevated to that position at the next consistory.

In response to the accusations of "integrism", Escrivá declared that, "Opus Dei is neither on the left nor on the right nor in the centre" and that "as regards religious liberty, from its foundation Opus Dei has never practised discrimination of any kind."  Opus Dei officials state that individual members are free to choose any political affiliation, emphasizing that among its members were also two important figures in the monarchist political opposition of the 1970s in Spain: the writer Rafael Calvo Serer, who was forced into exile by Franco's regime, and the journalist Antonio Fontán, who became the first president of the Senate after the transition to democracy.

John Allen has written that Escrivá was neither anti-Franco nor pro-Franco.  Some critics of Opus Dei, such as Miguel Fisac and Damian Thompson, have argued that the group has always sought "advancement not only of its message but also of its interests", and that it has consistently courted those with power and influence, without maintaining a coherent political ideology.

The alleged involvement of Opus Dei in Latin American politics has also been a topic of controversy.  According to US journalist Penny Lernoux, the 1966 military coup in Argentina happened soon after its leader, General Juan Carlos Onganía, attended a spiritual retreat sponsored by Opus Dei.  During his 1974 visit to Latin America, Escrivá visited Chile, only nine months after the coup d'état in Chile that deposed the elected Marxist president Salvador Allende and installed a right-wing military dictatorship under General Augusto Pinochet.  Escrivá declined an invitation to visit personally with the Chilean government junta, alleging that he was ill with influenza, but in his letter to the members of the junta he added that he wished "to let you know how much I pray, have prayed, and have gotten others to pray, for this great nation, especially when it found itself menaced by the scourge of the Marxist heresy."

Critics have charged that Opus Dei members supported Pinochet's coup and then had a role in the "Miracle of Chile" of the 1980s similar to that of the "technocrats" during the Spanish Miracle of the 1960s.  However, among the major right-wing politicians, only Joaquín Lavín (who did not occupy public office under Pinochet) has been unequivocally identified as a member of Opus Dei.  Another member of Opus Dei, Jorge Sabag Villalobos, belongs to a centre-left party that opposed Pinochet's regime.  Peter Berglar, a German historian and member of Opus Dei, has written that connecting Opus Dei with fascist regimes is a "gross slander". Journalist Noam Friedlander states that allegations about Opus Dei involvement with the Pinochet regime are "unproven tales." Several of Escrivá's collaborators stated that he actually despised dictatorships.

Title of nobility
Another source of controversy about Escrivá was the fact that, in 1968, he requested and received from the Spanish Ministry of Justice the rehabilitation in his favor of the aristocratic title of Marquess of Peralta. According to the official Guía de grandezas y títulos del reino ("Guide to the grandeeships and titles of the realm"), the title of Marquess had originally been granted in 1718 to Tomás de Peralta, minister of state, justice and war for the Kingdom of Naples, by Archduke Charles of Austria. Until 1715, Archduke Charles had been, as "Charles III", a pretender to the Spanish throne (see War of Spanish Succession), and from 1711 until 1740 he ruled as Holy Roman Emperor and King of Naples.

Escrivá's successful petition of a title of nobility has aroused controversy not only because it might seem at odds with the humility befitting a Catholic priest, but also because the same title of Marquess of Peralta had been rehabilitated in 1883 by Pope Leo XIII and King Alfonso XII in favor of a man to whom Escrivá had no male-line family association: the Costa Rican diplomat Manuel María de Peralta y Alfaro (1847–1930). On that occasion, the documents ordering the rehabilitation claimed that the original title had been granted in 1738 (not 1718) to Juan Tomás de Peralta y Franco de Medina, by Charles of Austria in his capacity as Holy Roman Emperor, not as pretender to the Spanish throne. Ambassador Peralta, who in 1884 had married a Belgian countess, Jehanne de Clérembault, died without children in 1930. None of his kinsmen in Costa Rica requested the transmission of the marquessate, but one of them has published an extensive genealogical study that would seem to contradict any claim by Escrivá to the title.

Escrivá did not use the title of Marquess of Peralta publicly and, in 1972, he ceded it to his brother Santiago.  The argument by endorsers of Escrivá that he requested the rehabilitation of the title as a favor to his family, and that it was his intention from the beginning to cede it to his brother, seems belied by the fact that, in 1968, Santiago had requested for himself the rehabilitation of a different title of nobility, the barony of San Felipe, which was not granted. According to historian Ricardo de la Cierva (a former Minister of Culture in the Spanish government) and to architect Miguel Fisac (who knew Escrivá personally at the time), Escrivá's original request for the title might have been part of an unsuccessful attempt to join the Sovereign Military Order of Malta (SMOM), a Catholic religious order which required its members to be of noble birth and of which his deputy in Opus Dei, Álvaro del Portillo, was already a member.

Several biographers say Escrivá prohibited his devotees from asking for the title of Marquess of Peralta. They state that Escrivá accepted it due to the advice of some cardinals who told him that he had the obligation to do so for the sake of his brother, Santiago, and so as to practice what he preached about fulfilling civil duties and exercising rights. His brother Santiago said: "The decision was heroic because he knew that he will be vilified as a result... Josemaría did what is best for me. After the right amount of time has passed, without making use of the title (in fact he never had the intention of using it), he passed the title on to me."  On the other hand, according to de la Cierva, "Monsignor Escrivá's desire for a marquisate is not to my liking but seems to me, given his idiosyncrasies, comprehensible and even forgivable.  That the title should have been based on a falsification seems to me extremely sad and even extremely grave."

Relations with other Catholic leaders
Pauline priest Giancarlo Rocca, a church historian and a professor at the Claretianum in Rome, claims that Escrivá actively sought the rank of bishop but was twice refused by the Vatican curia, first in 1945, and later in 1950 (when he and his followers had lobbied for his appointment as bishop of Vitoria). According to Rocca, in both instances the curial officials expressed concerns about the organization of Opus Dei and about the psychological profile of Escrivá.

Sociologist Alberto Moncada, a former member of Opus Dei, has collected and published various oral testimonies about Escrivá's strained relations with other officials of the Catholic Church. In particular, Moncada quotes Antonio Pérez-Tenessa, who at the time was secretary general of Opus Dei in Rome, as witnessing Escrivá's intense displeasure over the election of Pope Paul VI in 1963, and later expressing doubts in private about the salvation of the Pope's soul.  According to María del Carmen Tapia, who worked with Escrivá in Rome, the founder of Opus Dei had "no respect" for Popes John XXIII or Paul VI and believed that his own organization of Opus Dei was "above the Church in holiness."

Luigi de Magistris, at the time the regent of the Vatican's Apostolic Penitentiary, wrote in a 1989 confidential vote asking for the suspension of the proceedings for Escrivá's beatification, that "it is not a mystery that there were serious tensions" between Escrivá and the Jesuits.  De Magistris then alluded to Escrivá distancing himself from the Jesuit priest Valentino Sánchez, who had previously been Escrivá's confessor, over the Jesuits' opposition to the proposed constitutions of Opus Dei.  Journalist Luis Carandell claims that, during his years in Rome, Escrivá kept his distance from the Jesuit Superior General, the Spaniard Pedro Arrupe, to the extent that Arrupe once joked with Antonio Riberi, the apostolic nuncio to Spain, about doubting whether Escrivá really existed.

According to Alberto Moncada, Escrivá's years in Rome were dedicated in large part to his campaign to make Opus Dei independent from the authority of diocesan bishops and of the Vatican curia, something which was finally achieved, after Escrivá's death, with the establishment in 1982, by Pope John Paul II, of Opus Dei as a personal prelature, subject only to its own prelate and to the Pope. As such, Opus Dei is currently the only personal prelature in the Catholic Church, although this juridical figure ―similar in nature to other kinds of hierarchical organization in the church's history, such as military and personal ordinariates― is fruit of the Second Vatican Council's aim to provide pastoral attention in ways more suited to the actual situation of many of its faithful. In this way, its work complements that of the dioceses, and in some cases even takes the form of a more direct collaboration: for example, when priests of Opus Dei assume pastoral care of parishes at the request of the local bishops. Escrivá may have had this in mind when he wrote, "The only ambition, the only desire of Opus Dei and each of its members is to serve the Church as the Church wants to be served, within the specific vocation God has given us." Membership in the prelature does not exempt a Catholic from the authority of the local diocesan bishop.

Beatification and canonization

After the death of Escrivá de Balaguer on 26 June 1975, the Postulation for the Cause of his beatification and canonization received many testimonies and postulatory letters from people all over the world. On the fifth anniversary of Escrivá's death, the Postulation solicited the initiation of the cause of beatification from the Vatican Congregation for the Causes of Saints. One-third of the world's bishops (an unprecedented number) petitioned for Escrivá's beatification.

His cause for beatification was introduced in Rome on 19 February 1981 on the strength of the apparently miraculous cure in 1976 of a rare disease, lipomatosis, suffered by Sister Concepción Boullón Rubio, whose family had prayed to Escrivá to help her. On 9 April 1990, Pope John Paul II declared that Escrivá possessed Christian virtues to a "heroic degree", and on 6 July 1991 the Board of Physicians for the Congregation of the Causes of Saints unanimously accepted the cure of Sister Rubio. He was beatified on 17 May 1992.

By way of a letter dated 15 March 1993, the Postulation for the Cause received news about the miraculous cure of Dr. Manuel Nevado Rey from cancerous chronic radiodermatitis, an incurable disease, which took place in November 1992. The reported miracle, apparently brought about by Escrivá's intervention, was ruled valid by the Congregation for the Causes of Saints and approved by Pope John Paul II in December 2001, enabling the canonization of Escrivá. John Paul II, who frequently expressed public endorsement of Opus Dei and its work, canonized Escrivá on 6 October 2002.  The canonization Mass was attended by 42 cardinals and 470 bishops from around the world, general superiors of many orders and religious congregations, and representatives of various Catholic groups. During the days of the canonization event, church officials commented on the validity of the message of the founder, repeating John Paul II's decree Christifideles Omnes on Escrivá's virtues, which said that "by inviting Christians to be united to God through their daily work, which is something men will have to do and find their dignity in as long as the world lasts, the timeliness of this message is destined to endure as an inexhaustible source of spiritual light, regardless of changing epochs and situations."

Criticism of the process
Various critics questioned the rapidity of Escrivá's canonization. On the eve of Escrivá's beatification in 1992, journalist William D. Montalbano, writing for the Los Angeles Times, described it as "perhaps the most contentious beatification in modern times." Critics have argued that the process was plagued by irregularities. However, endorsers refer to Rafael Pérez, an Augustinian priest who presided over the tribunal in Madrid for Escrivá's cause, as "one of the best experts" on canonization. Pérez stated that the process was fast because Escrivá's figure is "of the universal importance," the Postulators "knew what they were doing", and, in 1983, the procedures were simplified in order to present "models who lived in a world like ours." Flavio Capucci, the postulator, also reported that the 6,000 postulatory letters to the Vatican showed "earnestness".

Escrivá's canonization was one of the first to be processed after the 1983 Code of Canon Law streamlined the procedures for canonization, and so it was processed more quickly than was typical before. Mother Teresa was canonized even more quickly, having been beatified just 6 years after her death (Escrivá was beatified in 17 years). According to journalist Kenneth L. Woodward, the 6,000-page long positio (the official document about the life and work of the candidate for sainthood prepared by the postulators) was declared confidential, but leaked to the press in 1992, after Escrivá's beatification. Woodward declared that, of 2,000 pages of testimonies, about 40% are by either Álvaro del Portillo or Javier Echevarría Rodríguez who, as successors of Escrivá at the head of Opus Dei, would have the most to gain from the Catholic Church recognizing that organization's founder as a saint. The only critical testimony quoted in the positio was by Alberto Moncada, a Spanish sociologist who had been a member of Opus Dei and whose testimony might have been easier for the church authorities to dismiss because he had had little personal contact with Escrivá and had left the Catholic Church altogether. This critical testimony covered a mere two pages.

Critics of the process also questioned the fact that some of the physicians involved in the authentication of the two "scientifically inexplicable cures" achieved through the posthumous intercession of Escrivá, such as Dr. Raffaello Cortesini (a heart surgeon), were themselves members of Opus Dei. The Vatican has stated that the Medical Consultants for the Congregation affirmed unanimously that the miraculous cure of a cancerous state of chronic radiodermatitis in its third and irreversible stage in Dr. Manuel Nevado Rey (a country doctor in the village of Almendralejo) was "very quick, complete, lasting and scientifically inexplicable." After six months, the theological consultants, according to the Vatican, also unanimously attributed this cure to Escrivá. On the year of his canonization, the Opus Dei prelate reported that the Postulation has gathered 48 reports of unexplained medical favors attributed to Escriva's intercession, as well as 100,000 ordinary favours.

Former Opus Dei members critical of Escrivá's character who claim that they were refused a hearing during the beatification and canonization processes include Miguel Fisac (a well-known Spanish architect who was one of the earliest members of Opus Dei and remained an associate of Escrivá for nearly twenty years), Vladimir Felzmann (a Czech-born engineer and Catholic priest from the UK, who was Escrivá's personal assistant), María del Carmen Tapia (who worked with Escrivá in Opus Dei's central offices in Rome and directed its printing press), Carlos Albás (a Spanish lawyer who was also Escrivá's first cousin once removed), María Angustias Moreno (who was an official of the women's part of Opus Dei, during Escrivá's lifetime), and Dr. John Roche (an Irish physicist and historian of science who was a member of Opus Dei from 1959 to 1973, and managed one of its schools in Kenya). Several groups critical of Escrivá and of Opus Dei emerged both before and after the canonization of Escrivá, including the Opus Dei Awareness Network (ODAN), and "OpusLibros", both collaborations of former members who now oppose Opus Dei and its practices.

According to journalist Kenneth L. Woodward, before the official beatification he

Catholic theologian Richard McBrien termed Escrivá's sainthood "the most blatant example of a politicized [canonization] in modern times." According to Catholic writer and biographer John Allen such views are countered by many other ex-members, the present members, and the estimated 900,000 people who attend activities of Opus Dei. He says that the interpretation of the facts "seems to depend upon one's basic approach to spirituality, family life, and the implications of a religious vocation."  Allen's account of Opus Dei and its founder, however, was not accepted by all reviewers as impartial.

Reports of discord among judges
Escrivá's canonization attracted an unusual amount of attention and criticism, both within the Catholic Church and by the press. Flavio Capucci, the postulator of Escrivá's cause for sainthood, summarized the main accusations against Escrivá: that "he had a bad temper, that he was cruel, that he was vain, that he was close to Spanish dictator Francisco Franco, that he was pro-Nazi and that he was so dismayed by the Second Vatican Council that he even travelled to Greece with the idea that he might convert to the Orthodox religion".

A Newsweek article by Woodward claimed that, of the nine judges of the Congregation for the Causes of Saints presiding over Escrivá's cause for beatification, two had requested a suspension of the proceedings. The dissenters were identified as Luigi De Magistris, a prelate working in the Vatican's tribunal of the Apostolic Penitentiary, and Justo Fernández Alonso, rector of the Spanish National Church in Rome.  According to Woodward, one of the dissenters wrote that the beatification of Escrivá could cause the church "grave public scandal." The same article quoted Cardinal Silvio Oddi as declaring that many bishops were "very displeased" with the rush to canonize Escrivá so soon after his death. In interviews, José Saraiva Martins, Cardinal Prefect of the Congregation for the Causes of Saints, has denied being aware of that dissent.

The journal Il Regno, published in Bologna by the congregation of the Priests of the Sacred Heart (the Dehonians), reproduced, in May 1992, the confidential vote of one of the judges in Escrivá's cause of beatification, in which the judge asked that the process be suspended.  The document questioned the haste of the proceedings, the near absence of testimony from critics in the documentation gathered by the postulators, the failure of the documentation to properly address issues about Escrivá's relations with the Franco regime and with other Catholic organizations, and suggestions from the official testimonies themselves that Escrivá lacked proper spiritual humility.  This document does not identify the judge by name, but its author indicates that he met Escrivá only once, briefly, in 1966, while serving as a notary for the Holy Office, which implies that the judge in question was De Magistris.

As regent of the Apostolic Penitentiary, at the time of the vote De Magistris's work was largely concerned with issues arising from confession and penance.  According to church law, a confessor has an absolute duty not to disclose anything that he might have learned from a penitent in the course of a confession (see Seal of the Confessional in the Catholic Church).  In his vote, which its own contents date to August 1989, De Magistris argued that the testimony from the main witness, Álvaro del Portillo, should have been entirely excluded from the proceedings, since Portillo had been Escrivá's confessor for 31 years.

John Allen Jr. comments that, according to some observers within the Catholic Church, De Magistris was punished for his opposition to Escrivá's canonization. De Magistris was promoted in 2001 to the head of the Apostolic Penitentiary, an important position in the Vatican bureaucracy usually occupied by a cardinal.  However, Pope John Paul II did not make De Magistris a cardinal and replaced him as head of the Apostolic Penitentiary after less than two years, effectively forcing him into retirement.  The decision by Pope Francis to make De Magistris a cardinal at the consistory of 14 February 2015, when De Magistris was about to turn 89 and therefore could no longer participate in papal conclaves, was interpreted by some commentators as consolation for how De Magistris had been treated under John Paul II.

Teachings and legacy

The significance of Escrivá's message and teachings has been a topic of debate, by Catholics and others.  The Protestant French historian Pierre Chaunu, a professor at the Sorbonne and president of the Academy of Moral and Political Sciences, said that "the work of Escrivá de Balaguer will undoubtedly mark the 21st century. This is a prudent and reasonable wager. Do not pass close to this contemporary without paying him close attention". The Catholic theologian Hans Urs von Balthasar, who was appointed cardinal by Pope John Paul II (but died in 1988 before his investiture), dismissed Escrivá's principal work, The Way, as "a little Spanish manual for advanced Boy Scouts" and argued that it was quite insufficient to sustain a major religious organization. However, the monk and spiritual writer Thomas Merton declared that Escrivá's book "will certainly do a great deal of good by its simplicity, which is the true medium for the Gospel message".

Critics of Opus Dei have often argued that the importance and originality of Escrivá's intellectual contributions to theology, history, and law, at least as measured by his published writings, has been grossly exaggerated by his devotees. However, various officials of the Catholic Church have spoken well of Escrivá's influence and of the relevance of his teachings. In the decree introducing the cause of beatification and canonization of Escrivá, Cardinal Ugo Poletti wrote in 1981: "For having proclaimed the universal call to holiness since he founded Opus Dei during 1928, Msgr. Josemaría Escrivá de Balaguer, has been unanimously recognized as the precursor of precisely what constitutes the fundamental nucleus of the Church's magisterium, a message of such fruitfulness in the life of the Church." Sebastiano Baggio, Cardinal Prefect of the Congregation for Bishops, wrote a month after Escrivá's death: "It is evident even today that the life, works, and message of the founder of Opus Dei constitutes a turning point, or more exactly a new original chapter in the history of Christian spirituality." A Vatican peritus or consultor for the process of beatification said that "he is like a figure from the deepest spiritual sources". Franz König, Archbishop of Vienna, wrote in 1975:

"The magnetic force of Opus Dei probably comes from its profoundly lay spirituality. At the very beginning, in 1928, Msgr. Escrivá anticipated the return to the Patrimony of the Church brought by the Second Vatican Council ... [H]e was able to anticipate the great themes of the Church's pastoral action in the dawn of the third millennium of her history."

The "absolutely central" part of Escrivá's teaching, says American theologian William May, is that "sanctification is possible only because of the grace of God, freely given to his children through his only-begotten Son, and it consists essentially in an intimate, loving union with Jesus, our Redeemer and Savior."

Escrivá's books, including Furrow, The Way, Christ is Passing By, and The Forge, continue to be read widely, and emphasize the laity's calling to daily sanctification (a message also to be found in the documents of Vatican II). Pope John Paul II made the following observation in his homily at the beatification of Escrivá:

John Paul II's decree Christifideles omnes states: "By inviting Christians to seek union with God through their daily work — which confers dignity on human beings and is their lot as long as they exist on earth — his message is destined to endure as an inexhaustible source of spiritual light regardless of changing epochs and situations".

Writings

See also
 Catholic Church in Spain
 List of Catholic saints
 List of saints canonized by Pope John Paul II
 Opus Dei
 Saint Josemaría Escrivá, patron saint archive
 The Way
 There Be Dragons

References

Bibliography

Opus Dei members
 
  Collection of contributions to a theological symposium; contributors include Ratzinger, del Portillo, Cottier, dalla Torre, Ocariz, Illanes, Aranda, Burggraf and an address by Pope John Paul II.
 . A study of Opus Dei based on the life story and work of its founder written by a professor of history at the University of Cologne.
 
 
 
 
 
Official Catholic Church documents
 
 
 
  The speech summarizes Escrivá and Opus Dei's mission, work, message, and the main features of his teachings
 
 
 
Others

Further reading

Official Catholic Church documents
 Pope John Paul II. Homilies and discourses about the founder of Opus Dei.
Opus Dei members
 

 
 
 
 

 
 
 
 
 
 
Others
 
 
 Luis Carandell (1992). Vida y milagros de Monseñor Escrivá de Balaguer – hosted by OpusLibros (critical)
 Kenneth Woodward (1992). "A Coming-Out Party in Rome, Opus Dei prepares to stand by its man" (pdf; 540 kB), Newsweek, May 18, 1992
 Opposition to Canonization by ODAN (opposition)
 B. Badrinas, ed. (1992). Testimonies on Josemaría Escrivá, Founder of Opus Dei, Sinagtala. – collection of some testimonies given by ecclesiastical officials which were used for the beatification process.
 Jesús Ynfante (2002). El santo fundador del Opus Dei. Biografía completa de Josemaría Escrivá – hosted by OpusLibros (critical)
 William May (2003). Holiness and Ordinary Life in the Teaching of Saint Josemaría Escrivá – theological analysis of Escrivá's teachings
 
 
 
 
 Fabro Cornelio, Garofalo Salvatore, Raschini Maria Adelaide (1992). Santi nel mondo. Ares, 
 
 
 Eugueny Pazukhin (2000). Blessed Josemaría Escrivá's Life and Achievement – first Russian biography by an Orthodox thinker, philosopher and journalist

External links

 Patron Saints Index: St Josemaría Escrivá (primary source)
 St Josemaría Escrivá, the founder of Opus Dei
 St. Josemaria Institute
 Documents of the Holy See about Opus Dei and its founder
 Writings of Josemaría Escrivá
 ODAN Opus Dei Awareness Network (opposition)
 Letter from Escriva to Franco
 Josemaria Escrivá and Nazism
 EWTN webpage, containing biography, spiritual writings, video-audio presentation 
 Comments by Popes on Josemaría Escrivá
 Interview with Cardinal Julian Herranz about Josemaría Escrivá
 Josemaría Escrivá's Crusade for Holiness: The Life and Times of Opus Dei Founder
 Most recent accounts of favors received
 St. Josemaría Escrivá Historical Institute, Rome

1902 births
1975 deaths
20th-century Christian mystics
20th-century Christian saints
20th-century Spanish Roman Catholic priests
20th-century Spanish lawyers
Ascetics
Beatifications by Pope John Paul II
Canonizations by Pope John Paul II
Christian radicals
Founders of Catholic religious communities
Francoist Spain
Marquesses of Spain
Opus Dei leaders
People from Barbastro
Roman Catholic mystics
Second Vatican Council
Spanish chaplains
Spanish male writers
Spanish Christian mystics
Spanish Roman Catholic saints
20th-century Spanish Roman Catholic theologians
Spiritual writers
Venerated Catholics by Pope John Paul II